Thaisella mariae is a species of sea snail, a marine gastropod mollusk, in the family Muricidae, the murex snails or rock snails.

Description
The length of the shell attains 27 mm.

Distribution
This species occurs in the Atlantic Ocean off Brazil.

References

 Lange de Morretes, F. (1954). Nova Thais do Brasil. Arquivos do Museu Paranaense. 10(2): 339−340
 Claremont, M., Williams, S. T., Barraclough, T. G. & Reid, D. G. (2011). The geographic scale of speciation in a marine snail with high dispersal potential. Journal of Biogeography. 38, 1016-1032.
 Claremont, M., Vermeij, G. J., Williams, S. T. & Reid, D. G. (2013). Global phylogeny and new classification of the Rapaninae (Gastropoda: Muricidae), dominant molluscan predators on tropical rocky seashores. Molecular Phylogenetics and Evolution. 66: 91–102.

External links
 Gernet M. de V., Belz C.E., Birckolz C.J., Simone L.R.L. & Parellada C.I. (2018). A contribuição de Frederico Lange de Morretes para a malacologia brasileira. Arquivos de Zoologia. 49(3): 153-165

mariae
Gastropods described in 1954